Divya Spandana (born 29 November 1982), better known by her screen name Ramya, is an Indian actress and politician. She served as the Member of Parliament in the Lok Sabha from Mandya, Karnataka.  She primarily works in Kannada, alongside Tamil language films. Ramya is the recipient of two Filmfare Awards South, an Udaya Award, and a Karnataka State Film Award.

Ramya made her acting debut in the 2003 Kannada-language film Abhi. Although she has sporadically worked in Tamil and Telugu films her work in Kannada film industry garnered her greater attention. She won the Udaya Award and Filmfare Award for Best Actress for the Amrithadhare (2005) and Tananam Tananam (2006) respectively. Her performance as the eponymous heroine in the 2011 romantic drama Sanju Weds Geetha garnered her further critical success and a Karnataka State Film Award for Best Actress. Ramya has also starred in the 2011 blockbuster fantasy film Katari Veera Surasundarangi and other commercially successful films including the 2016 epic-fantasy Nagarahavu.

Ramya joined the Indian National Congress in 2012 as a member of its youth wing; she later won a 2013 by-election to become a Member of Parliament for Mandya constituency in Karnataka, but was defeated in the general elections the following year.

Early life 
Ramya was born in Bangalore, Karnataka, on 29 November 1982. Her parents are from Mandya; mother Ranjitha is a senior member of the Congress Party in Karnataka while her foster father, R. T. Narayan, was an industrialist. In 2004, she had claimed that she was the granddaughter of politician and former Chief minister of Karnataka S. M. Krishna. Ramya studied at St. Hilda's School, a residential school, in Ooty, and at Sacred Heart School (Church Park), Chennai, Tamil Nadu.

Ramya was pursuing a career in modeling and hoped to join Mumbai-based Sheetal Designer Studio after completing her graduation with a bachelor's degree in commerce from St. Joseph's College of Commerce, Bangalore. She had taken part in ramp shows and was crowned Miss Country Club in 2001. Around this time, film offers came her way, and was considered for Ninagagi, Dumbee and Appu, before being cast opposite Puneeth Rajkumar in Abhi. It was here that she was given the screen name Ramya by the film's producer Parvathamma Rajkumar.

Film career 

Ramya made her feature film debut with Puneeth Rajkumar's 2003 Kannada film Abhi. She made her first appearance in the Tamil film industry with the stage name Ramya, with the 2004 film Kuththu. The film had a successful run at the box office, as did her next Tamil film, Giri. Her debut film, however, gave her the name 'Kuthu' Ramya, by which she was then popularly known in Tamil Nadu, she had major box-office success with three Kannada films – Aakash, Gowramma and Amrithadhare – garnering critical acclaim for her performances and establishing her as a leading actress.

In 2006, she starred in Julie, a remake of the 1975 Hindi-language film, but it failed to attract audiences. After her following release, Datta, her next Kannada release, Jothe Jotheyali, was a successful venture in spite of unfavorable reviews by critics. Her final 2006 release, Tananam Tananam, an average performer that released to mixed reviews, gained Ramya her first Filmfare Award for Best Actress. She had described her role in the film as "little complex" and "challenging". In 2007, Ramya starred in three feature films; the first of these, Arasu, was a huge hit. She then appeared as a sex worker in a film made to create awareness about AIDS as part of Mira Nair's AIDS Jaago project. Her last 2007 film was Polladhavan, released during Deepavali; it was considered a commercial success and her breakthrough in Tamil. Rajinikanth was all praises for the entire crew of Polladhavan.

Her first 2008 release, the Kannada film Mussanjemaatu, was a big hit, and gained her a nomination for a Best Actress Award at the 56th Filmfare Awards South. She followed this with the Tamil film Thoondil. Ramya later stated that she regretted accepting the film. Later that year, she starred in the films Bombaat and Anthu Inthu Preethi Banthu, the former performing well at the box office. Her final release in 2008 was Gautham Vasudev Menon's Vaaranam Aayiram, which also won that year's National Award for the best feature film in Tamil. She was credited as Divya in Vaaranam Aayiram. She dubbed her own voice for this film, which became a critical and commercial success. She did not have any releases in 2009, since both her films, Bhimoos Bang Bang Kids and Jothegaara, were delayed due to financial problems.

Her first release of 2010, Just Math Mathalli, received rave reviews, with appreciation for her role. She had two more releases that year, the long-delayed Jothegaara and Kiccha Huccha. Her next release was the Tamil film Singam Puli, followed by the romantic drama Sanju Weds Geetha. This film opened to positive reviews, with Ramya being praised by critics for her performance, which was considered among the best in her career.

Her first release in 2012 was a comedy drama, Sidlingu, in which she portrayed the role of a school teacher. This was followed by a light-comedy movie, Lucky. She appeared in the semi-mythological movie Katari Veera Surasundarangi. In August 2013, Ramya announced that she was considering quitting acting to pursue a career in politics.

Following her brief political career, Ramya made her acting comeback in 2016 with Nagarahavu, a film which placed deceased actor Vishnuvardhan in the lead role through visual effects. The film received negative reviews upon the release and failed to attract an audience.

Political career 
Ramya joined the Indian Youth Congress in 2012.
She became the Indian National Congress (INC) Member of Parliament from Mandya constituency in Karnataka by winning the by-election in 2013. In the 2014 Indian general election, she again contested from Mandya but was defeated by C. S. Puttaraju by a margin of 5,500 votes. In March 2017, there was speculation that she might follow her political mentor S M Krishna and join BJP, but she continued with Congress.

In May 2017 she was given the task of reviving INC's social media wing and was made national head of Congress's digital team at national level. She took over the social media team from Deepender Singh Hooda. According to various newspapers and media houses, she is instrumental in turning around Rahul Gandhi's and INC's social media image.

In August 2017, Ramya created the online campaign #AintNoCinderella to support Varnika Kundu, a woman who was "chased and almost kidnapped" one night in Chandigarh. Senior Haryana state BJP politician Ramveer Bhatti told press the attack was Kundu's fault for being out so late: "The girl should not have gone out at 12 in the night. Why was she driving so late in the night? The atmosphere is not right. We need to take care of ourselves."

The campaign started when Ramya and friends began posting photos of themselves out late at night with the hashtag #AintNoCinderella. "Why shouldn't women go out after midnight?" Ramya told the BBC. "I'm asking people like Mr Bhatti who are they to set curfew hours for us? I want to ask him who is he to question us? This is such a regressive mindset."

On 3 October 2018, there was a rumor that she was reportedly upset with Congress Party and there was a speculation that she had stepped down as its social media head.

Filmography

Awards and nominations

References

External links 

 
 Official Twitter

1982 births
Living people
Indian film actresses
Indian actor-politicians
Kannada people
Politicians from Bangalore
Filmfare Awards South winners
India MPs 2009–2014
Actresses in Tamil cinema
Actresses in Kannada cinema
Actresses in Telugu cinema
Indian National Congress politicians from Karnataka
Lok Sabha members from Karnataka
21st-century Indian actresses
Actresses from Bangalore
21st-century Indian women politicians
21st-century Indian politicians
Women members of the Lok Sabha
People from Mandya district
Women members of the Karnataka Legislative Assembly